The 2018 Sun Bowl was a college football bowl game that was played on Monday, December 31, 2018. It was the 85th edition of the Sun Bowl, and was one of the 2018–19 bowl games concluding the 2018 FBS football season. Sponsored by Hyundai Motor America, the game was officially known as the Hyundai Sun Bowl.

Teams
The game featured Stanford of the Pac-12 Conference and Pittsburgh of the Atlantic Coast Conference (ACC). The two programs have previously met three times, most recently in 1932, with Pittsburgh holding a 2–1 series lead. The referee for the game, David Smith of the Southeastern Conference (SEC), was the quarterback and MVP for Alabama in the 1988 Sun Bowl.

Stanford Cardinal

Stanford started off the season with four straight wins, including a victory over rival USC, and they rose in the polls from No. 13 to No. 7 by the time they met Notre Dame on September 29. They lost, 38–17, which dropped them to No. 14. This began a stretch where in five games they suffered four losses, to Notre Dame, Utah, Washington State and Washington, which dropped them out of the polls and serious contention for the North Division title in the Pac-12. Stanford finished with three straight wins to end their regular season with eight victories. This was the ninth consecutive season of bowl eligibility for the Cardinal, and it was their first Sun Bowl invite since the 2016 edition.

Pittsburgh Panthers

Pittsburgh started their season with four losses in their first seven games, losing to ranked opponents such as Penn State, UCF, and Notre Dame. However, the Panthers pulled off a four game winning streak, including victories over teams such as No. 23 Virginia before closing out their regular season with a loss to Miami. Pittsburgh's 6–2 conference record was good enough for first in the Coastal Division in the ACC, earning them a birth in the ACC Championship Game against No. 2 Clemson, where they were soundly defeated, 42–10. This was the Panthers' first Sun Bowl appearance since the 2008 edition, and tenth bowl appearance in the past eleven seasons.

Game summary

Scoring summary

Statistics

References

External links

Box score at ESPN

Sun Bowl
Sun Bowl
2018
2018
Sun Bowl
Sun Bowl